The Meredosia Bridge is a two-lane tied-arch bridge constructed in 2018 that carries Illinois Route 104 (IL 104) across the Illinois River between Pike County, Illinois and the city of Meredosia, Morgan County, Illinois.

See also

References

External links
 "IL Route 104 over Illinois River" Study

Bridges completed in 1936
Bridges over the Illinois River
Buildings and structures in Morgan County, Illinois
Bridges in Pike County, Illinois
U.S. Route 67
Steel bridges in the United States
Road bridges in Illinois